Rapid Creek may refer to:

Rapid Creek (Iowa River), a river in Iowa
Rapid Creek (South Dakota), a tributary of the Cheyenne River in the United States
Rapid Creek, Northern Territory in Australia